The Awakening of Helena Richie is a surviving 1916 silent film produced by B. A. Rolfe and distributed by Metro Pictures. It is based on the 1906 novel, The Awakening of Helena Richie, by Margaret Deland and the 1909 Broadway play based on the novel starring Margaret Anglin and then child actor Raymond Hackett.

This silent film version brings Ethel Barrymore to the Helena Richie role (as Anglin refused to do films) and Barrymore's surname meant better business in the movie world. This film still survives incomplete in the Library of Congress and was reputed to be Barrymore's favorite of her silent film work.

Actor Robert Cummings also played his same part in the 1909 Broadway play.

Cast
Ethel Barrymore - Helena Richie
Robert Cummings - Lloyd Pryor
Frank Montgomery - Benjamin Wright
James A. Furey - Dr. Lavendar (*J.A. Furey)
Maurice Steuart - Little David
Hassan Mussalli - Sam Wright
William A. Williams - Deacon Wright (*William Williams)
Robert Whittier - Frederick Richie
Charles Goodrich - Dr. King
Hattie Delaro - Mrs. King
Mary Asquith - Mrs. Wright
Kathleen Townsend -

See also
Ethel Barrymore on stage, screen and radio

References

External links

1916 films
American silent feature films
Films based on American novels
American films based on plays
Films based on adaptations
American black-and-white films
Films based on multiple works
Metro Pictures films
Films directed by John W. Noble
1910s American films